Sunday Review is the opinion section of The New York Times. It contains columns by a number of regular contributors (such as David Brooks and Paul Krugman), and usually includes op-eds by the Editorial Board.

References

The New York Times